Stefano Morona (born 6 August 1957 in Cortina d'Ampezzo, Italy) is an Italian curler.

At the national level, he is a seven-time Italian men's champion curler and a four-time Italian senior men's champion curler.

Teams

References

External links
 
 

Living people
1957 births
People from Cortina d'Ampezzo
Italian male curlers
Italian curling champions
Sportspeople from the Province of Belluno